Neutron may refer to several comic book characters:

 Neutron (DC Comics), a DC Comics character
 Neutron (Linus), an Italian comics character from Linus
 Neutron (Marvel Comics), a Marvel Comics character

See also
Neutron (disambiguation)